Barrington DeVaughn Hendricks (born October 22, 1989), known professionally as JPEGMAFIA (stylized in all caps), is an American rapper, singer, and record producer from Brooklyn, New York. His 2018 album Veteran, released through Deathbomb Arc, received widespread critical acclaim and was featured on many year-end lists. It was followed by 2019's All My Heroes Are Cornballs and 2021's LP!, released to further critical acclaim.

Early life and education
Hendricks was born in Flatbush, Brooklyn, to Jamaican parents. He spent the majority of his childhood in Flatbush, before moving to Alabama at age 13, where he experienced a significant amount of racism that later had an intense effect on his music. Hendricks moved to Louisiana and enlisted in the United States Air Force at age 18. He served a tour of duty in Iraq and also spent time in Kuwait, Germany, Japan, and North Africa, before being honorably discharged after speaking up against his superiors' reported abuse. Though he previously claimed to have a master's degree in journalism, Hendricks has since clarified that, though having studied the subject while deployed, he was not officially awarded a degree. In April 2021, Hendricks revealed through social media that he had "a sexually, verbally, and physically abusive childhood."

Career
Hendricks developed an interest in music production at the age of 15, and he began producing after he learned how to sample. Describing his production, Hendricks says "When I was first making beats, no one liked the beats. To this day I give people beats and they're just confused." He says "I started rapping because no one liked my beats." Noting that he started producing before he started rapping, Hendricks said "I'm a producer first kind of, and then a rapper second but I take both of them seriously."

During his military stay in Japan, he was producing and writing music under the name Devon Hendryx. In 2015, he moved to Baltimore, where he began to make music under his moniker JPEGMAFIA,  under which he released his mixtape Communist Slow Jams in April 2015. Only a month later, he released his mixtape Darkskin Manson which was inspired by the Freddie Gray protests in Baltimore that were happening right as he had moved there.
Following a number of mixtapes, Hendricks released his debut studio album, Black Ben Carson, in February 2016 via Deathbomb Arc featuring a much harsher, distorted sound than his other projects. Four months later, he released a collaborative EP with fellow Baltimore-based rapper Freaky titled The 2nd Amendment.
After less than 3 years living there, Hendricks moved from Baltimore to Los Angeles for his next studio album. In January 2018, he released his second studio album Veteran. In an article on Bandcamp, he said "I wanted to show I'm not just a one-trick pony. I always do weird shit. I usually just keep it to myself. This time, I just let the filter go." At the time of its release, Veteran was considered JPEGMAFIA's most experimental album to date, receiving widespread critical acclaim.

After the release of Veteran, Hendricks started working on his next album. He recorded 93 songs, and whittled it down to 18 tracks. He mixed and mastered it at the end of Vince Staples' tour, posting percentage updates frequently on his Instagram. Prior to the release, he would label the project as a "disappointment" in interviews and his social media. The first single from the album, "Jesus Forgive Me, I Am a Thot", was released on August 13, 2019. He promoted the album by uploading a series of listening sessions to his YouTube channel where friends and artists such as Denzel Curry, Jeff Tweedy (of Wilco) and Hannibal Buress discussed and reacted to cuts off of the album. All My Heroes Are Cornballs was released on September 13, 2019, to further critical acclaim, and was his first album to chart. In October 2019, he embarked on the JPEGMAFIA Type Tour to support his new album.

In 2020, Hendricks released several singles across the span of the year, and compiled them into an EP, aptly titled EP! It was released on Hendricks' Bandcamp page on November 6, and on streaming services with the addition of one extra single on December 10. On February 12, 2021, Hendricks released his second extended play, EP2! On October 2, Hendricks announced the album LP! , which was released on October 22, 2021, his birthday, to further acclaim. Due to sample-related issues, the album was released as two separate versions: LP! released on streaming services, and LP! (Offline) released for free on Bandcamp, YouTube, and Soundcloud. On February 24, 2022, Hendricks announced via Twitter that the songs not on the "Online" version had been released to streaming services as the OFFLINE! EP. On November, 9, 2022, Hendricks was dropping hints to dropping three albums for 2023.

On January 15, 2023, Hendricks made a hint on his social media that he's working on a collaborative project with fellow rapper, Danny Brown. On January 20, 2023, Hendricks officially announced three albums will be dropping the same year. On February 10, 2023, Hendricks announced on his Twitter that the collaborative project with Danny Brown was finished, and is working on his second album for the year. On February 28, 2023 on The Danny Brown Show, both Hendricks and Brown announced that their collaborative project is named Scaring the Hoes Vol. 1, and played a sneak peek of the first single on the project. On March 13 2023, the first single of the project called Lean Beef Patty was released to streaming services, and Hendricks announced that the collaborative project is set to release on March 24, 2023.

Artistry 
His music has mostly been described as experimental hip-hop but has been said to incorporate a wide range of genres into his music such as trap, R&B, vaporwave, and noise rap.

In an interview with Cambridge Union, Hendricks noted that his biggest influence is Kanye West. He states that one of his earliest influences was the rock group Hanson. He has also cited Ol' Dirty Bastard, Throbbing Gristle, Skinny Puppy, MF DOOM, Lil B, Chief Keef, Ice Cube, Rick Rubin, Cam'Ron, Björk, Janelle Monáe, Radiohead, The Backstreet Boys, Dirty Beaches and Arca as influences.

In other media 
In March 2020, Hendricks started a vlog series on his YouTube channel called HTBAR (How To Build A Relationship). The series feature JPEGMAFIA talking to other artists and friends about various topics, mostly about music, life and politics. Each episode's soundtrack consist of unreleased songs, demos and instrumentals produced by JPEGMAFIA. Artists that have featured on the vlog series include Danny Brown, Kenny Beats, Lykke Li, Orville Peck, Saba and more. Hendricks has also appeared on The Cave, a YouTube series created by hip hop producer Kenny Beats.

Hendricks is a fan of professional wrestling, and has incorporated several references to it in his songs. He made an appearance for wrestling promotion All Elite Wrestling (AEW) on an episode of their television show AEW Dynamite in September 2020. In 2021, AEW star Darby Allin was featured on Hendricks' thirteenth HTBAR episode.

Hendricks appeared on the 7th episode of season 5 of The Eric Andre Show, "Named After My Dad's Penis", and competed in the third Rapper Warrior Ninja sketch - a parody of the TV show Sasuke (which aired in the United States of America under the title Ninja Warrior) and its American spin-off American Ninja Warrior. Hendricks competed along with Lil Yachty, Murs, Trippie Redd, and Zack Fox in a challenge to cross a platform while freestyling and dodging various attacks. Hendricks fell off the platform while freestyling and failed.

Personal life
Hendricks currently lives in Los Angeles, California.

Discography

Studio albums
 Black Ben Carson (2016)
 Veteran (2018)
 All My Heroes Are Cornballs (2019)
 LP! (2021)

Collaborative albums
 The 2nd Amendment (2016) 
 Scaring the Hoes, Vol. 1 (2023) (with Danny Brown)

References

External links
Official website

African-American male rappers
American communists
Alternative hip hop musicians
American hip hop record producers
American avant-garde musicians
East Coast hip hop musicians
Hardcore hip hop artists
People from Flatbush, Brooklyn
Indie rappers
Living people
Rappers from Baltimore
Underground rappers
1989 births
21st-century American rappers
21st-century American male musicians
American musicians of Jamaican descent
United States Air Force personnel of the Iraq War